While the Rest of Us Die: Secrets of America's Shadow Government is a Vice on TV documentary television series exploring twentieth-century and twenty-first-century continuity of government measures of the United States federal government, the social, racial, and class inequalities these measures point to, the changing and inconsistent meanings of the concepts of "defense" and "homeland security", and the costs of COG infrastructure and maintenance to the United States federal budget. The series debuted November 16, 2020.

The series was inspired by the 2017 book Raven Rock: The Story of the U.S. Government's Secret Plan to Save Itself—While the Rest of Us Die by Garrett M. Graff.  The Raven Rock Mountain Complex providing a title for the book is a nuclear bunker in Southern Pennsylvania intended to serve as a secondary Pentagon in case of the destruction or disabling of the primary headquarters in Washington, D.C. and is also discussed in the television documentary series.  The series is narrated by American actor Jeffrey Wright.

Episodes

Season 1 (2020)

Season 2  (2021)

References

External links
 
 

2010s American documentary television series
Aftermath of the Cold War
American upper class
Continuity of government in the United States
Politics and race in the United States
Viceland original programming
Works about the September 11 attacks